"Holla Holla" is the debut single by American rapper Ja Rule from his debut studio album Venni Vetti Vecci. It was produced by Taiwan "Tai" Green and Irv Gotti. The music video was directed by Hype Williams and Irv Gotti.

A remix and the album's third single featured, Jay-Z, Vita, Caddillac Tah, Black Child, Memphis Bleek and Busta Rhymes, the latter of which would later feud with Ja Rule.

Background and composition
After Ja Rule finalized the recording of his debut studio album, Venni Vetti Vecci (1999), Def Jam – Ja Rule's record label – did not consider any song on the album worthy of marketing as a single. Despite Ja Rule's surprise at this proclamation, admitting in an interview with Complex magazine that he "didn’t grasp the idea of making a radio record", he resumed recording sessions to compose what would become "Holla Holla": it would transpire to be the final song recorded for Venni Vetti Vecci. Ja Rule's rapping on "Holla Holla" employs what he described as his "stutter flow", with the repetition of certain words to increase the volume of lyrics.

Reception
Writing for the Los Angeles Times, Soren Baker felt that "Holla Holla" demonstrates Ja Rule's ability to use "his edgy voice and the spectacular instrumentation that backs him".

Track listing
 "Holla Holla" (Street Version)
 "Holla Holla" (Instrumental)
 "BJ Skit"
 "It's Murda" (Street Version)
 "It's Murda" (Instrumental)
 "Kill 'Em All" (Street Version)

Charts

Weekly charts

Year-end charts

Credits
 Taiwan Green– producer
 Irv Gotti – producer, mixing
 Ken Ifill – mixing
 Ja Rule – vocals, rap
 Patrick Viala – engineer

In popular culture
The song is played in The Sopranos season 2 episode "Toodle Fucking-Oo" when Tony arrives at the scene of Livia's house where Meadow threw a party.

References

1999 debut singles
Ja Rule songs
Music videos directed by Hype Williams
Songs written by Ja Rule
1998 songs
Def Jam Recordings singles
Songs written by Irv Gotti
Gangsta rap songs